Debomoy Sanyal is a Bharatiya Janata Party politician from Assam. He has been fielded as the candidate from the Dhubri constituency by his party in the 2014 Indian general election.

References

Assam politicians
National Democratic Alliance candidates in the 2014 Indian general election
Bharatiya Janata Party politicians from Assam
Living people
Year of birth missing (living people)
Place of birth missing (living people)